This is a list of players named to participate in the men's basketball competition at the Games of the XXX Olympiad.

Group A

Argentina
The following is the Argentina roster in the men's basketball tournament of the 2012 Summer Olympics.

France
The following is the France roster in the men's basketball tournament of the 2012 Summer Olympics.

Lithuania
The following is the Lithuania roster in the men's basketball tournament of the 2012 Summer Olympics.

Nigeria
The following is the Nigeria roster in the men's basketball tournament of the 2012 Summer Olympics.

Tunisia
The following is the Tunisia roster in the men's basketball tournament of the 2012 Summer Olympics.

United States

The following is the United States roster in the men's basketball tournament of the 2012 Summer Olympics.

|}
| style="vertical-align:top;" |
 Head coach
Mike Krzyzewski
 Assistant coach(es)
Jim Boeheim
Mike D'Antoni
Nate McMillan
Jerry Colangelo (executive director)

Legend
Club – describes lastclub before the tournament
Age – describes ageon July 29, 2012
|}

Group B

Australia
The following is the Australia roster in the men's basketball tournament of the 2012 Summer Olympics.

Brazil
The following is the Brazil roster in the men's basketball tournament of the 2012 Summer Olympics.

China

The following is the China roster in the men's basketball tournament of the 2012 Summer Olympics.

Great Britain
The following is the Great Britain roster in the men's basketball tournament of the 2012 Summer Olympics.

Russia
The following is the Russia roster in the men's basketball tournament of the 2012 Summer Olympics.

Spain
The following is the Spain roster in the men's basketball tournament of the 2012 Summer Olympics.

References

rosters
2012